The 1992 Nigerian Senate election in Anambra State was held on July 4, 1992, to elect members of the Nigerian Senate to represent Anambra State. Chuba Okadigbo representing Anambra North and Ebenezer Chukwuemeka Ikeyima representing Anambra Central won on the platform of Social Democratic Party, while Matthias Nwafor Chukwuma representing Anambra South won on the platform of the National Republican Convention.

Overview

Summary

Results

Anambra North 
The election was won by Chuba Okadigbo of the Social Democratic Party.

Anambra Central 
The election was won by Ebenezer Chukwuemeka Ikeyima of the Social Democratic Party.

Anambra South 
The election was won by Matthias Nwafor Chukwuma of the National Republican Convention.

References 

Ana
Anambra State Senate elections
July 1992 events in Nigeria